Beyyurdu can refer to:

 Beyyurdu, Hınıs
 Beyyurdu, Şemdinli
 Beyyurdu, Sungurlu
 Beyyurdu Dam